Onsøy is a peninsula and a former municipality in Østfold county, Norway. The administrative centre was Gressvik.

History
The parish of Onsø was established as a municipality January 1, 1838 (see formannskapsdistrikt). A part of Onsøy with 170 inhabitants was moved to the neighboring municipality Fredrikstad on 1 January 1968.

On 1 January 1994 the rest of Onsøy was incorporated into Fredrikstad. Prior to the merger Onsøy had a population of 12.923.

Etymology
The Old Norse form of the name was Óðinsøy. The first element is the genitive case of the name of the god Odin, the last element is øy meaning 'island'.  The former island was later turned into a peninsula because of post-glacial rebound.

Onsøy Church
Onsøy Church (Onsøy kirke) was built in 1877. The architect was Henrik Thrap-Meyer. The church is of Gothic Revival style and constructed  of brick with has 375 seats. Onsøy Church is located in Fredrikstad parish. Jens Bjelke was buried in the churchyard.

Elingaard Manor

Elingaard Manor (Elingaard herregård) is  a manor house located on Onsøy. The current main building was erected in the Renaissance style and was completed early in 1749. The building was constructed on two floors and consists of a main wing and two side wings. Outside is a garden laid out by English model. The manor house was developed by Chancellor Jens Ågessøn Bjelke (1580–1659). Jens Bjelke, one of the wealthiest men in Norway,   was the grandson of Jens Tillufssøn Bjelke and the father of  Jørgen Bjelke. His elder son Admiral Henrik Bjelke (1615–83) inherited Elingaard Manor.  Elingaard manor is currently operated as a museum.

References

Other sources
Borges, Grethe (2007)  Elingaard : et gammelt herresete  (Fredrikstad] : Fredrikstad museum)  

Populated places established in 1838
Populated places disestablished in 1994
Former municipalities of Norway
Fredrikstad
Manor houses in Norway
1838 establishments in Norway